3204 Lindgren, provisional designation , is a carbonaceous background asteroid from the outer regions of the asteroid belt, approximately  in diameter. It was discovered on 1 September 1978, by Soviet astronomer Nikolai Chernykh at the Crimean Astrophysical Observatory in Nauchnij, on the Crimean peninsula. The B-type asteroid has a rotation period of 5.6 hours. It was named after Swedish writer Astrid Lindgren.

Orbit and classification 

Lindgren is a non-family asteroid from the main belt's background population. It orbits the Sun in the outer asteroid belt at a distance of 2.3–4.0 AU once every 5 years and 7 months (2,051 days; semi-major axis of 3.16 AU). Its orbit has an eccentricity of 0.28 and an inclination of 2° with respect to the ecliptic. The body's observation arc begins with its official discovery observation at Nauchnij in 1978.

Physical characteristics 

Lindgren has been characterized as a "bright" carbonaceous B-type asteroid in both the Tholen-like and SMASS-like taxonomy of the Small Solar System Objects Spectroscopic Survey (S3OS2). It is also an assumed C-type asteroid.

Rotation period 

In August 2012, two rotational lightcurves of Lindgren were obtained from photometric observations by astronomers at the Palomar Transient Factory in California. Lightcurve analysis gave a rotation period of 5.614 and 5.618 hours with a brightness amplitude of 0.15 magnitude in the S- and R-band, respectively.

Diameter and albedo 

According to the surveys carried out by the Japanese Akari satellite and the NEOWISE mission of NASA's Wide-field Infrared Survey Explorer, Lindgren measures between 19 and 21 kilometers in diameter and its surface has an albedo between 0.05 and 0.065.

The Collaborative Asteroid Lightcurve Link assumes a standard albedo for a carbonaceous asteroid of 0.057 and calculates a diameter of 20.21 kilometers based on an absolute magnitude of 12.2.

Naming 

This minor planet was named after Swedish writer Astrid Lindgren (1907–2002), a recipient of the Hans Christian Andersen Award and known for her children's books such as Pippi Longstocking. The official naming citation was published by the Minor Planet Center on 2 April 1988.

References

External links 
 Asteroid Lightcurve Database (LCDB), query form (info )
 Dictionary of Minor Planet Names, Google books
 Discovery Circumstances: Numbered Minor Planets (1)-(5000) – Minor Planet Center
 
 

003204
Discoveries by Nikolai Chernykh
Named minor planets
19780901